FC Lion Pride is a humanitarian football team based in Sierra Leone. The team donates a percentage of profits from sales of players to humanitarian causes. A number of their players have had trials at major Danish clubs.

References

Football clubs in Sierra Leone
Association football clubs established in 2005
2005 establishments in Sierra Leone